Philip Staveley Foster (11 July 1865 – 5 March 1933) was a Conservative Party politician in the United Kingdom.

Early life
Foster was the only son of Abraham Briggs Foster, chairman of the alpaca and mohair spinning firm of John Foster and Son of Black Dyke Mills, Queensbury, near Bradford. The firm had been founded by Philip's great-grandfather. He went to Eton College in 1879 and Magdalen College, Oxford in 1884, leaving with a degree three years later.

In the late 1880s he held a commission in the 6th West Yorkshire Militia, and from 1890 in the Staffordshire Yeomanry, where he was promoted to Major in 1900.

Parliamentary career
After running unsuccessfully for Parliament in 1899 in a by-election to the Elland seat in West Yorkshire, he was elected for the constituency of Stratford-on-Avon in a by-election in June 1901, a seat he held until the election of 1906. Re-elected in 1909, he held the seat until its abolition in 1918.

Public life
He became a director and later, a firm chairman of the family firm John Foster and Sons. He was also chairman of the Air League, and chairman of the Midland Automobile Club. A keen angler and farmer, he became High Sheriff of Sussex for 1931.

Family
Foster married, in 1890, Louisa Frances Wemyss, daughter of Colonel Wemyss.  They had three children. He bought a house in Old Buckhurst, Withyham, where he died in 1933 aged 67.

References

 Obituary, "Mr. P. S. Foster", The Times, 5 March 1933.
Hansard – Contributions by Philip Foster in the House of Commons

External links 
 

1865 births
1933 deaths
People educated at Eton College
Alumni of Magdalen College, Oxford
Conservative Party (UK) MPs for English constituencies
UK MPs 1900–1906
UK MPs 1906–1910
UK MPs 1910
UK MPs 1910–1918
Staffordshire Yeomanry officers
People from Withyham